Scymnus paracanus is a species of dusky lady beatle in the family Coccinellidae. It is found in North America.

Subspecies
These two subspecies belong to the species Scymnus paracanus:
 Scymnus paracanus linearis Gordon, 1976
 Scymnus paracanus paracanus J. Chapin, 1973

References

Further reading

 

Coccinellidae
Articles created by Qbugbot
Beetles described in 1973